Harry B. Cunningham (1907 in Pennsylvania – November 11, 1992 in North Palm Beach, Florida) was an American businessman and retailer who founded Kmart in 1962, along with S. S. Kresge. Cunningham had a vision to convert the retail chain into a discounter.  At the time, Cunningham was sharply criticized by some, including Kresge shareholders, as possibly destroying the company.  The success of Kmart proved his vision.

He was president of the company from 1959 to 1972, having joined the retailer as an assistant store manager in 1930. Cunningham was credited by Sam Walton as being the first to design a discount store. Walton added that Cunningham should be remembered as one of the leading retailers of all time. Cunningham and Walton both visited, and were impressed by, the early and innovative discounter Ann & Hope in Cumberland, Rhode Island.

References

External links 
 20th Century Great American Business Leaders
 Chicago tribune obituary
 New York Times obituary

1907 births
1992 deaths
American businesspeople in retailing
20th-century American businesspeople
Businesspeople from Pennsylvania
Kmart
People from North Palm Beach, Florida